Arthur-Marie Le Hir (b. at Morlaix, Finistère, in the Diocese of Quimper, France, 5 December 1811; d. at Paris, 13 January 1868) was a French Biblical scholar and Orientalist.

Life
Entering the seminary of Saint-Sulpice, Paris, in 1833, he joined the Sulpicians after ordination, and was appointed professor of theology. He was then made professor of Sacred Scripture and also of Hebrew, to which branches he had been thoroughly formed by Garnier, a scholar, according to Ernest Renan, "who had a very solid knowledge of languages and the most complete knowledge of exegesis of any Catholic in France" (Souvenirs d'enfance et de jeunesse, 269). Le Hir continued in that teaching until his death, about thirty years later. Through his own work and that of his pupil, Renan, he influenced powerfully the revival of Biblical and Oriental studies in France.

Renan regarded him as the best Hebrew and Syriac scholar of France in his generation, who was thoroughly versed in Biblical science, including the current German works, whose theories he combatted.

Some lay to his uncompromising attitude the defection of Renan, which was so harmful to religion in France. Most students of his books would hesitate about accepting Renan's judgment that he "was certainly the most remarkable man in the French clergy of our day" (op. cit., 273). Robert Irwin stated that Renan said his own grasp of Arabic was so bad because his teacher's was so bad.

Works
Le Hir published only a few articles, which, along with others, were collected, after his death in the two volumes entitled "Etudes Bibliques", Paris, 1869. That work shows him at his best in the range and solidity of his acquirements and in the breadth of his views. His other writings, all posthumous and not left by him ready for the press, are studies in the translation and exegesis of certain Biblical works: "Le Livre de Job" (Paris, 1873); "Les Psaumes" (Paris, 1876); "Les trois Grands Prophètes Isaie Jérémie, Ezéchiel" (Paris, 1876); "Le Cantique des Cantiques" (Paris, 1888).

References

Attribution
 This article cites:
 BERTRAND, Bibliothèque Sulpicienne, II (Paris, 1900), with a lengthy description of Le Hir's writings and references to articles concerning him cf. IDEM in VIG., Dict. de la Bible s. v.
 Ernest Renan, Souvenirs d'enfance et de jeunesse (Paris, 1883)221, 269, 274, 288
 IDEM in Journal Asiatique, XIJ (Paris, 1568), 19
 JULES SIMON Quatre Portraits (Paris, 1896), containing reminiscences of a supposed judgment of Renan upon Le Hir

1811 births
1868 deaths
People from Morlaix
French biblical scholars
French orientalists
French Hebraists
Translators from Hebrew
19th-century French theologians
19th-century translators